Isaac Olson (born 1 June 2000) is a Canadian rugby union player, currently playing for the New England Free Jacks of Major League Rugby (MLR) and the Canada national team. His preferred position is wing.

Professional career
Olson signed for Major League Rugby side New England Free Jacks for the 2022 Major League Rugby season. 

Olson debuted for Canada against Belgium during the 2021 end-of-year rugby union internationals.

References

External links
itsrugby.co.uk Profile

2000 births
Living people
Canada international rugby union players
Rugby union wings
Canadian rugby union players
Sportspeople from British Columbia
New England Free Jacks players